Razbin (also Romanized as Rāzbīn; also known as Razian) is a village in Mojezat Rural District, in the Central District of Zanjan County, Zanjan Province, Iran. At the 2006 census, its population was 1,076, in 226 families.

References 

Populated places in Zanjan County